Whole Lotta Lovin' or Whole Lot of Loving may refer to:

Songs
Whole Lotta Lovin' (Fats Domino song),	1959
"A Whole Lotta Lovin' ", a 1971 song by Anita Carter
"That's a Whole Lotta Lovin' (You Give Me)", a 1973 song by Kenny Starr
"Whole Lotta Lovin' " (Six song), 1975
"Whole Lotta Lovin' ", a song by Huey Lewis from the 1986 album Fore!
"Whole Lotta' Lovin", a song by Filipino rapper Francis Magalona from the 1998 album The Oddventures of Mr. Cool
"Whole Lotta Loving", a song by B.B. King from the 2012 album Ladies and Gentlemen... Mr. B.B. King
"Whole Lotta Lovin' " (DJ Mustard song), 2016